A Christmas Snow is a 2010 direct-to-video independent Christmas film by Trost Moving Pictures. It stars Catherine Mary Stewart, Muse Watson, Anthony Tyler Quinn and newcomer Cameron ten Napel. There is also a guest appearance by Danny Cahill as the Food Critic. A soundtrack based on the film is being produced by Bryan Popin. Author Jim Stovall will write a novelized version of A Christmas Snow.

Plot 
For the past 30 years, Kathleen (Catherine Mary Stewart) has carried around the haunting memory of her father abandoning her and her mother on Christmas Eve. She blames her mother for that night and now refuses to celebrate Christmas at all. Although she tries to forget her past, it has not forgotten her. Because of a blizzard, Kathleen finds herself stuck in her home with two strangers during the days leading up to Christmas. Sam (Muse Watson), a gentle older man Kathleen took in for the night, and Lucy (Cameron Ten Napel), the daughter of her soon to be fiancé (Anthony Tyler Quinn) bring her face to face with the hurts of her past. She has to choose between letting go and grabbing hold of a life-changing forgiveness, or continuing to carry her pain and bitterness.

Production 
A Christmas Snow was filmed in Tulsa, Oklahoma, on an 18-day schedule. The final scene was shot at the Greyhound Bus terminal at Fourth and Detroit streets. Filming was completed on February 25, 2010, after an overnight shoot.

Distribution 
Exploration Films signed on to take over distribution of the film in 2018

See also 
 List of Christmas films

References

External links 
 
 

2010 films
American Christmas drama films
Films shot in Oklahoma
2010s Christmas films
2010s Christmas drama films
2010 drama films
2010s English-language films
2010s American films